William Frankfather (born Billy Joe Frankfather; August 4, 1944 – December 28, 1998) was an American actor.

Early life
Frankfather was born in Kermit, Texas on August 4, 1944.

Career
Frankfather guest-starred in many popular television series of the late 20th century, including MacGyver, Night Court, The A-Team, Hill Street Blues, Remington Steele, Murphy Brown, Picket Fences, Star Trek: Deep Space Nine, Melrose Place, Empty Nest, Wings, NYPD Blue, Tales from the Crypt and Mama's Family.

Frankfather received his bachelor's and master's degrees, both in English literature, from New Mexico State University, and received a master of fine arts degree in acting from Stanford University.

He performed on many theater stages, including on Broadway in the original cast of Children of a Lesser God. He was a 25-year member of Theatre 40, a professional theater company in Beverly Hills, California. He was artistic director of Theatre 40 for five years up to June 1998.

Frankfather received six DramaLogue awards for acting and producing, and as artistic director of Theatre 40, produced works by playwrights such as Mark Medoff and Sam Shepard.

His feature-film credits include Mouse Hunt, The Rocketeer, and Death Becomes Her, but is best remembered on-screen for his menacing performance as Whitey Jackson, the killer albino, in the 1978 comedy film Foul Play.  Notably, Frankfather is able to achieve serious menace despite the fact you never hear a word of dialogue spoken by his character 'Whitey Jackson' throughout the film.  There is a scene where Whitey Jackson is using a payphone while Goldie Hawn watches him from an upstairs window but you never hear what he says so his voice remains unknown.

Personal life and death
Frankfather died at University of California at Los Angeles Medical Center December 28, 1998, from complications of liver disease. He was 54. Frankfather is survived by his wife, Elizabeth, and his son, Richard.

Filmography

Film

Television

External links
 

1944 births
1998 deaths
20th-century American male actors
American male film actors
American male television actors
Male actors from Texas
New Mexico State University alumni
People from Kermit, Texas